Johannes Cornelis "Hans" van Houwelingen (born 25 March 1945, Rotterdam) is a Dutch mathematician and a professor emeritus of medical statistics at Leiden University.

Career
After graduating from Utrecht University in 1968 with a major in mathematics and a minor in theoretical physics and mathematical statistics, Van Houwelingen started working at Utrecht University at the Institute for Mathematical Statistics. In 1969 he joined Philips. A year later he returned to the Institute for Mathematical Statistics. Van Houwelingen earned his PhD at Utrecht University in 1973; his dissertation, entitled On empirical Bayes rules for the continuous one-parameter exponential family, was supervised by Gerard Jan Leppink. He was appointed as a professor at Leiden University in 1986.

In his retirement speech on 26 November 2008, Van Houwelingen stated that "Expecting the Unexpected is a very accurate job description for a biostatistician. The mission of statisticians is to anticipate what could happen and assist others in forming sensible responses. This mission is not limited to advising others. It also concerns research in their own field." He continued to publish as an emeritus, at least until 2020.

Awards and honours

Books
 Inleiding tot de medische statistiek (in Dutch), 1993, with Theo Stijnen and Roel van Strik,  
 Dynamic Prediction in Clinical Survival Analysis, 2011, with Hein Putter, published by Taylor & Francis,  
 Handbook of Survival Analysis, 2013, with John P. Klein, Joseph G. Ibrahim, and Thomas H. Scheike, published by Taylor & Francis,

References

External links
 Profile page (Leiden University)
 List of publications on Google Scholar

Living people
Dutch statisticians
Utrecht University alumni
Academic staff of Leiden University
Scientists from Rotterdam
1945 births